The Bartlett–Hawkes Farm is a historic house at 15 Winnetaska Road, in the Waban village of Newton, Massachusetts.  With its oldest portion dating to about 1736, it is the oldest surviving building in Waban.  Enlarged several times, it was moved to its present location from Beacon Street in 1915.  It was listed in the National Register of Historic Places on September 4, 1986.

Description and history
The Barlett–Hawkes Farm is located in a residential area west of the center of Waban village, on the west side of Winnetaska Road at its junction with Quidnic Road. It is a -story wood-frame structure, eight bays wide, with a side-gable roof and clapboard siding.  The rear roof extends down to the first floor, giving the house a saltbox profile.  There are two entrances on the main facade, each two bays in from a side.  Both have Federal period surrounds with pilasters and a corniced entablature; the one on the left also has half-length sidelight windows.

Bartlett and his wife Anne raised seventeen children in the house, expanding it to five bays. His son Peregrine sold the farm to George Hawkes, another local farmer, in the mid-19th century. Later owners further extended the building in the early 20th century, added bays on the north side and adding the saltbox shed to the rear.

See also
 National Register of Historic Places listings in Newton, Massachusetts

References

National Register of Historic Places in Newton, Massachusetts
Farms on the National Register of Historic Places in Massachusetts
Buildings and structures in Newton, Massachusetts